Dany Robin (14 April, 1927 – 25 May, 1995) was a French actress of the 1950s and the 1960s.

Career
Robin was born Danielle Robin in Clamart. She performed with Peter Sellers in The Waltz of the Toreadors, and co-starred opposite Kirk Douglas in the 1953 romantic drama Act of Love. Robin co-starred with Connie Francis, Paula Prentiss, and Janis Paige in Follow the Boys (1963). Her last leading role was the agent's wife Nicole Devereaux in Alfred Hitchcock's Topaz (1969).

Personal life and death
Robin was married to fellow actor Georges Marchal. On 25 May 1995, she and her second husband, Michael Sullivan, died in a fire in their apartment in Paris.

Selected filmography

 Lunegarde (1946) - Martine
 Gates of the Night (1946) - Étiennette
 Six heures à perdre (1947) - Rosy
 Destiny Has Fun (1947) - Gabrielle
 Man About Town (1947) - Lucette
 L'Éventail (1947) - Martine
  (1948) - Corinne
 Monelle (1948) - Monelle Picart
 The Passenger (1949) - Nicole Vernier
 The Unexpected Voyager (1950) - Dany
  (1950) - Hélène
 Thirst of Men (1950) - Julie
  (1951) - Zoé
 Two Pennies Worth of Violets (1951) - Thérèse Delbez
 Une histoire d'amour (1951) - Catherine Mareuil
 Jupiter (1952) - Yvette Cornet
 She and Me (1952) - Juliette Capulet épouse Montaigu
 Holiday for Henrietta (1952) - Henriette
 The Lovers of Midnight (1953) - Françoise Letanneur
 Julietta (1953) - Julietta Valendor
 Act of Love (1953) - Lise Gudayec / Madame Teller
 Tempi nostri - Zibaldone n. 2 (1954) - Lei
  (1954) - Monique de Lomanach
 Cadet Rousselle (1954) - Violetta Carlino
 Stopover in Orly (1955) - Michèle Tellier dite 'Baby Face'
 Napoléon (1955) - Désirée Clary
 Frou-Frou (1955) - Antoinette Dubois dit 'Frou-Frou'
 Maid in Paris (1956) - Penny Benson
 It Happened in Aden (1956) - Albine
  (1956) - Annick Bernier
 Let's Be Daring, Madame (1957) - Danielle
 It's All Adam's Fault (1958) - Eléonore 'Nora' de Savigny
  (1958) - Christine Dumartin
 School for Coquettes (1958) - Ginette Masson
 Mimi Pinson (1958) - Mimi Pinson
 Suivez-moi jeune homme (1958) - Françoise Marceau
 Les Dragueurs (1959) - Denise
  (1959) - La comtesse de Monval
 Grounds for Divorce (1960) - Marylin
 Love and the Frenchwoman (1960) - Nicole Perret (segment "Adultère, L'")
 Famous Love Affairs (1961) - Madame de Monaco (segment "Lauzun")
 Tales of Paris (1962) - Antonia (segment "Antonia")
 Waltz of the Toreadors (1962) - Ghislaine
 Conduite à gauche (1962) - Catherine
 The Mysteries of Paris (1962) - Irène
 Mandrin (1962) - Baronne d'Escourt
 Follow the Boys (1963) - Michele Perrier
 How Do You Like My Sister? (1964) - Martine Jolivet
 La corde au cou (1965) - Isabelle
 Don't Lose Your Head (1966) - Jacqueline
 The Best House in London (1969) - Babette
 Topaz (1969) - Nicole Devereaux (final film role)

References

External links

1927 births
1995 deaths
People from Clamart
French film actresses
Accidental deaths in France
20th-century French actresses